Year 282 (CCLXXXII) was a common year starting on Sunday (link will display the full calendar) of the Julian calendar. At the time, it was known as the Year of the Consulship of Probus and Victorinus (or, less frequently, year 1035 Ab urbe condita). The denomination 282 for this year has been used since the early medieval period, when the Anno Domini calendar era became the prevalent method in Europe for naming years.

Events 
 By place 
 Roman Empire 
 Emperor Probus travels towards Sirmium (Serbia). He tries to employ his troops in peaceful projects, such as draining the swamps in Pannonia. 
 The praetorian prefect Marcus Aurelius Carus usurps power in Raetia. Probus attempts to organise a campaign against Carus but is murdered by his discontented troops in Sirmium.
 Carus defeats the Quadi and Sarmatians on the Danube; for his victories he is given the title Germanicus Maximus.
 Carus appoints his sons Carinus and Numerian as Caesar.

 China 
 A new city is constructed in Fuzhou, slightly south of the original city Ye (the main street of the city has remained unchanged since that time).

 By topic 
 Religion 
 The Patriarch Theonas of Alexandria becomes one of the first bishops to use the title Pope.

Births

Deaths 
 Huangfu Mi (or Shi'an), Chinese historian (b. 215)
 Jia Chong, Chinese politician and statesman (b. 217)
 Marcus Aurelius Probus, Roman emperor (b. 232)
 Xue Ying (or Daoyan), Chinese politician and poet

References